Paul J. Cormier is a business executive who serves as chairman of Red Hat. He previously served as Chief executive officer (CEO) from April 6, 2020 until July 12, 2022.

Early life and education 
Cormier was born in Fitchburg on November 4, 1959. His interest in computers started during his high school years when his father got him a summer job in Digital Equipment Corporation where he kept working until his college years. He attended the Fitchburg State University and did his master's degree in Rochester Institute of Technology. After graduation, he participated in Graduate Engineering Education Program of IBM and Digital.

Career at Red Hat 
Cormier joined Red Hat in May 2001 as Executive Vice President of Engineering and initiated the commercialization of open source products by promoting cloud services. He also helped the creation of Red Hat Enterprise Linux.

Becoming CEO 
Cormier was appointed CEO of Red Hat on 6 April 2020 by replacing Jim Whitehurst. He then was replaced by Matt Hicks on 12 July 2022 and became chairman of the company.

References  

Year of birth missing (living people)
Living people
Red Hat employees
American chief executives